Play: The Guitar Album is the seventh studio album by American country music artist Brad Paisley. It was released on November 4, 2008 (see 2008 in country music). Like all of his previous albums, Play was released on Arista Nashville and produced by Frank Rogers. The album is largely instrumental in nature, except for five vocal tracks. One of these tracks, "Start a Band" (a duet with Keith Urban), has been released as a single and has become Paisley's ninth consecutive Number One country hit, and his thirteenth overall.  The album cover photograph was taken at Bristow Run Elementary School  in Bristow, Virginia.

Content
Play is largely an album of instrumentals, though Paisley sings five duets with other vocalists, including B.B. King, Buck Owens, and Keith Urban. King and Urban both play guitar on their respective duet tracks. Another track, "Cluster Pluck", features James Burton, Vince Gill, Albert Lee, John Jorgenson, Brent Mason, Redd Volkaert and Steve Wariner. The Buck Owens duet is a song which Owens co-wrote. It is not strictly a country music record, featuring jazz guitar and a song described by Paisley as "very heavy metal." The final track, "Waitin' on a Woman", was first included on Paisley's 2005 album Time Well Wasted, and was later re-recorded as a bonus track to 2007's 5th Gear, from which it was released as a single. The version featured here includes guest vocals from Andy Griffith, and is the version used in the song's music video.

"Start a Band", the only single from the album, was released in September 2008. It is a collaboration with Keith Urban, who sings duet vocals and plays second lead guitar on it, and it reached Number One on the Billboard country singles charts in January 2009. At the 51st Grammy Awards, "Cluster Pluck" won the Grammy for Best Country Instrumental Performance, which was awarded to all of the guitarists featured.

Reception
The album so far has a score of 70 out of 100 from Metacritic based on "generally favorable reviews". Chris Neal of Country Weekly magazine gave Play four stars out of five, calling it "as indispensable as any album Brad has recorded to date—not to mention one of his best", also noting the "sharp melodies and constantly shifting musical terrain". Play received three-and-a-half stars out of five from Allmusic critic Stephen Thomas Erlewine, who referred to most songs as "fall[ing] within the realm of the expected", but cited others as "pure '80s shred[…]revealing a side he's previously camouflaged." Erlewine also said that, like Paisley's other albums, Play was "among the most adventurous and best country music of this decade." Ken Tucker of Billboard called the album "both outstanding and diverse" and made note of the Buck Owens duet, which he referred to as "bring[ing] an old friend back to life with the utmost respect."

Whitney Pastorek, reviewing the album for Entertainment Weekly, gave the album a B− rating. She referred to the duets as "a welcome respite from all the noodling", but said that as a whole, the album was "an indulgence he's earned but doesn't quite pull off." In his Consumer Guide, Robert Christgau picked out one song from the album, "Waitin' on a Woman", as a "choice cut", calling it "a good song on an album that isn't worth your time or money".

Track listing

Personnel
 Brad Paisley – lead and backing vocals (1-14, 16), electric guitar (1-14, 16), baritone guitar (1, 2, 4, 5, 7, 9), acoustic guitar (3, 4, 7, 9, 15, 16), mandolin (4, 7)
 Jim "Moose" Brown" – Farfisa organ (2), Hammond B3 organ (4, 5, 8, 16), Wurlitzer electric piano (4), acoustic piano (10)
 Bernie Herms – acoustic piano (16)
 Gordon Mote – acoustic piano (16)
 Gary Hooker – electric rhythm guitar (3, 14), 12-string electric guitar (7), baritone guitar (8), electric guitar (13), acoustic guitar (16)
 Keith Urban – electric guitar (3), lead vocals (3)
 Frank Rogers – acoustic guitar (6), Hammond B3 organ (13), 12-string electric guitar (16)
 Robert Arthur – electric rhythm guitar (8), acoustic guitar (13)
 Steve Wariner – electric guitar (9, 11, 12), lead vocals (9)
 James Burton – electric guitar (11, 12)
 Vince Gill – electric guitar (11, 12)
 John Jorgenson – electric guitar (11, 12)
 Albert Lee – electric guitar (11, 12)
 Brent Mason – electric guitar (11, 12)
 Redd Volkaert – electric guitar (11, 12)
 B.B. King – electric guitar (14), lead vocals (14)
 Bryan Sutton – acoustic guitar (16)
 Kendall Marcy – banjo (1, 7, 13), keyboards (16)
 Randel Currie – steel guitar (1-6, 8, 9, 10, 13, 14, 16)
 Buck Owens – dobro (6), mandolin (6), lead vocals (6)
 Kevin "Swine" Grantt – bass guitar (1, 2, 5, 6, 8, 11-14, 16), fretless bass (4), upright bass (7, 10)
 Kenny Lewis – bass guitar (3), backing vocals (16)
 Ben Sesar – drums (1-14, 16)
 Eric Darken – percussion (3-6, 9, 12, 13, 14, 16)
 Justin Williamson – fiddle (1, 3, 6-9, 13, 14, 16)
 Aubrey Haynie – fiddle (16)
 Wes Hightower – backing vocals (3, 6, 9, 16)
 Snoop Dogg – intro rap (7)
 Little Jimmy Dickens – voice (11)
 Manny Rogers – voice (11)
 Andy Griffith – lead vocals (16)

Toy Band on "Huckleberry Jam"
 Brad Paisley – electric guitar, bass guitar 
 Frank Rogers – acoustic piano 
 Brian David Willis – drums 

Group vocals on "Cluster Pluck"
 James Burton, Vince Gill, John Jorgenson, Albert Lee, Brent Mason, Redd Volkaert and Steve Wariner

Production 
 Frank Rogers – producer, overdub recording 
 Brian David Willis – associate producer, recording, overdub recording, digital editing 
 Jim Catino – A&R direction 
 Richard Barrow – recording
 Neal Cappellino – overdub recording
 Justin Niebank – mixing, additional overdub engineer (3)
 Chris O'Donnell – additional overdub engineer (6)
 John Harvey – additional overdub engineer (12)
 Nick Michaud – additional overdub engineer (12)
 Seth Morton – overdub recording assistant
 John Netti – overdub recording assistant
 Mark Petaccia – overdub recording assistant
 Matt Price – overdub recording assistant
 Steve Short – overdub recording assistant, recording assistant 
 Greg Lawrence – mix assistant 
 Brady Barnett – digital editing 
 Tyler Moles – digital editing
 Hank Williams – mastering 
 MasterMix (Nashville, Tennessee) – mastering location 
 Phillip Stein – production assistant 
 Judy Forde-Blair – creative production, album notes 
 Brad Paisley – cover design, packaging concept 
 Ben Enos – live photography 
 Kendall Marcy – playground photography 
 Chad Weaver – studio photography 
 The Fitzgerald Hartley Co. – management

Chart performance

Weekly charts

Year-end charts

Singles

References

2008 albums
Brad Paisley albums
Arista Records albums
Albums produced by Frank Rogers (record producer)
Instrumental albums